Yonas Solomon (born 21 June 1994) is an Eritrean footballer who plays for Al Khartoum SC of the Sudan Premier League, and the Eritrea national team.

Club career
Solomon started his professional career with Adulis Club of the Eritrean Premier League from 2013 to 2016. He then transferred to Al-Ahli Club (Atbara) of the Sudan Premier League until 2017. He then joined fellow-Sudanese side Al Khartoum SC. As of 2015 he was one of only two Eritreans playing in Sudan, along with Samyoma Alexander.

International career
Yonas made his senior international debut on 29 November 2013 in a 2013 CECAFA Cup match against Sudan. He went on to represent the nation in its 2018 FIFA World Cup qualification series against Botswana.

International career statistics

References

External links
 
 

Living people
1994 births
Eritrean footballers
Eritrean expatriate footballers
Expatriate footballers in Sudan
Eritrea international footballers
Association football defenders
Eritrean Premier League players
Adulis Club players
Sudan Premier League players